R.C. Singh was a member of the Rajya Sabha for the West Bengal constituency, and a member of the Communist Party of India.

References

External links
 Profile on Rajya Sabha website

Communist Party of India politicians from West Bengal
Living people
Rajya Sabha members from West Bengal
Year of birth missing (living people)